Raphitoma echinata is a species of sea snail, a marine gastropod mollusk in the family Raphitomidae.

Subspecies
 Raphitoma echinata pumila Monterosato, 1890

Description
The shell length varies between 12 mm and 20 mm.

Distribution
This species is distributed in the Mediterranean Sea along Apulia, Greece, and the Balearic Islands. They are also found north of the Hebrides and in the North Sea. As they occupy the coasts and the former Doggerland, it can be ascertained that Raphitoma echinata enjoy shallow waters.

References

 Gofas, S.; Le Renard, J.; Bouchet, P. (2001). Mollusca, in: Costello, M.J. et al. (Ed.) (2001). European register of marine species: a check-list of the marine species in Europe and a bibliography of guides to their identification. Collection Patrimoines Naturels, 50: pp. 180–213
 Marine Benthic Fauna List, Læsø, Denmark

External links
 
 Brocchi G.B. (1814). Conchiologia fossile subapennina con osservazioni geologiche sugli Apennini e sul suolo adiacente. Milano. Vol. 1: i-lxxx, 1-56, 1-240; vol. 2: 241-712, 16 pls
 Bellardi L. (1877), I molluschi dei terreni terziarii del Piemonte e della Liguria /
 Locard A. (1891). Les coquilles marines des côtes de France. Annales de la Société Linnéenne de Lyon. 37: 1-385
 Natural History Museum, Rotterdam: Raphitoma echinata

echinata
Gastropods described in 1814